Eternal Now is a concept of time perception suggested by numerous proponents of New Age spirituality. Its characteristics vary from increased awareness of the present moment to a broader, more open and holistic perception of one's subjective past and potential variants of future. The concept is consonant with and constitutes an integration and development of a number of approaches to spiritual alertness and totality of perception advocated by various forms of Buddhist philosophy (in particular Zen Buddhism) , Shamanic practices, and other philosophical and spiritual directions, both ancient and contemporary.

Related terms used in various spiritual traditions and meditative practices include: restful alertness, total awareness, perception of here and now, as well as others.

See also
Mindfulness
Satipatthana

References

New Age